is a Japanese footballer who plays for J.League club Júbilo Iwata.

Club statistics
Updated to 18 February 2019.

References

External links

Profile at Shimizu S-Pulse

1996 births
Living people
Association football people from Shizuoka Prefecture
Japanese footballers
Japanese expatriate footballers
J1 League players
J2 League players
J3 League players
Belgian Pro League players
Shimizu S-Pulse players
J.League U-22 Selection players
Sint-Truidense V.V. players
Júbilo Iwata players
Association football defenders
Japanese expatriate sportspeople in Belgium
Expatriate footballers in Belgium